Dreams of the City or Ahlam al-Madina is a Syrian feature drama film by director Mohamed Malas. It is a coming-of-age story of a boy forced to flee his native Quneitra to Damascus in the turbulent 1950s.

Plot
The story is an autobiography of Dib, the main character in the film. Dib was brought up by a brutal father-in-law and a mother who was forced into a new marriage. This is partly an aubiography of Malas himself. It is set against the backdrop of the major political events of the 1950s in Syria and Egypt: the end of the dictatorship in Syria, Gamal Abdel Nasser's ascent to power and the nationalisation of the Suez Canal, and the short-lived The United Arab Republic between Syria and Egypt in 1958.

Awards
Carthage Film Festival- Tanit d'Or, 1985.
Berlin International Film Festival - Interfilm Award - Honorable Mention, 1985.
Valencia Festival of Mediterranean Cinema - Golden Palm, 1985.

References

External links
 

Syrian drama films
1980s Arabic-language films
Films directed by Mohammad Malas
1984 films